Hunter Creek is a census-designated place (CDP) in Gila County, Arizona, United States. The population was 48 at the 2010 census.

Geography
Hunter Creek is located in northern Gila County, bordered to the north by the Christopher Creek CDP. Arizona State Route 260 forms the border between the two communities. The namesake Hunter Creek, a tributary of Christopher Creek, flows westward through the southern part of the community. It is part of the Tonto Creek watershed.

Demographics

References

Census-designated places in Gila County, Arizona